Information for Foreigners is a play by Griselda Gambaro written in 1971. It is a promenade style site-specific theatre piece, in which the audience is led on a tour through a large house by a character known as a guide. Gambaro uses the play to discuss the lives of the desaparecidos and to simultaneously explore the nature of theatrical forms and the expectations of an audience. 

The play consists of twenty scenes. Multiple groups of audience members are led through a large house to different rooms and hallways where the scenes are presented. The play ends with the twentieth scene where all groups are to watch together in one large room.

Plot summary

 Scene 1 The group enters a dark room. The guide reveals a man wearing only a faded underwear. He covers himself and says he has the wrong room.
 Scene 2 The group comes to a locked door and hears a voice singing behind it. The voice denies the guide's request to enter with a group.
 Scene 3 A girl in wet clothes is sitting in a chair. A man yells at her and gives her a gun.
 Scene 4 The audience witnesses a recreation of the Milgram experiment.
 Scene 5 Takes place in the room of scene 2. A woman is holding her baby and the father tells a strange story with "no morals". The guide asserts they need more rehearsal.
 Scene 6 This scene occurs in the corridors and on the staircase. Gambaro stipulates that it should occur multiple overlapping times as different groups move through the same part of the house. A group of men attack two men playing audience members. The guide then leads the group into a catacomb and finds a body under a piece of canvas. He starts to stomp on the body, and a second guide enters the room and leads the audience out.
 Scene 7 The usher insults the girl in wet clothing and complains that there is not any art on the walls as expected. He puts the gun in her lap and warns her that one pull of the trigger will end everything. As the group is about to leave the room, an usherette comes in with a tray of wine offering it to the guests and assuring them there is no charge.
 Scene 8 The guide tries to bring the group to a new room, but two carpenters appear in the corridor and block the way by working on an unfinished table. The guide decided to take the audience back into the room from scene 3 and 7 but upon opening the door, sees men surrounding the girl and decides to go to "room 3." Back in the hall, the carpenters move the table aside to let the group pass.
 Scene 9 This scene is a depiction of the kidnapping of Marcelo Verdt and his wife Palacio de Verdt.
 Scene 10 Again in the room with the girl with wet clothes. The guide now has a glass of water for her which he forces her to drink. The guide then takes away her chair and gives it to an audience member. He harasses her again. A different guide comes in the doorway and tells them they are in the wrong room, that "it" is about to start "there," that there will be wine, and that they will be able to understand. The group is rushed from the room.
 Scene 11 The guide looks into a tall box in the hallway and opens it to reveal a man in a loincloth. He says hello to the man in the box then closes it again. The other guide tells him they must hurry into the next room, for if they miss the beginning they won't understand anything
 Scene 12 Instead of entering the room that the other guide called them to, the guide decides his group will follow a man who passed by whistling because "he looks happy." Shortly after following the man into a room with two happy neighbours two groups of men tied together at the waist surround and arrest the whistling man who represents Roberto Quieto. He is repeatedly charged with a crime and absolved in a repetitive scene of standing and being forced to sit.
 Scene 13 The guide opens the door to the room he had passed up before the previous scene. A girl lying on a bed sits up and delivers a monologue about how she wishes to die quietly and peacefully. Afterward, a man who appears to be an audience member walks up to her and covers her mouth killing her. Four men enter singing and put the girl into a sack. Shortly afterward her parents enter looking for her. The men say she was never there and carry off the corpse singing. The guide has the group follow the men out and after they enter a new room. An audience member then opens the door to follow and is hit by a club. The guide puts his body into a box like the one he opened in scene 11.
 Scene 14 A man and woman plan to plant bombs as part of a revolution. Police come and kill the man and drag them both off. The woman's shoe falls off. The police come to clean up and find the shoe. A police officer searches for the woman who owns the shoe, saying the price will marry her right away. They find a woman that the shoe belongs to who recites a poem. Then a gunshot is heard in the next room. The group enters to see the girl from scenes 3,7, and 8, is lying on the floor shot next to the pistol in her hand.
 Scene 15 Children in the hall play "Martin Fisherman," a game reminiscent of London Bridge. They begin to fight, and it escalates. Soon police come and beat half of the players with large clubs. The guide leads his group away in a hurry. Someone hands him a tin plate with garbage on it.
 Scene 16 The guide tries to enter a room, but the men inside will not let him enter saying they are still rehearsing. The guide tells the audience there is another way in and opens a box in the hall. Inside the box are two men. The guide gives them the plate, and they try to suck off the garbage it but the plate falls to the ground.
 Scene 17 The guide leads them into the room from scene 16 through a back door. They stand in an area behind folding screens. Through the screens they watch actors rehearse Othello. Two policemen come in and arrest the actors for murder and for laughing at the wrong time. This scene is similar to an event where police arrested actors in a similar house in santé fe on August 6, 1971.
 Scene 18 Children follow a "child monster" holding a club. The children sing and play "Anton Pirulero." One of the children takes the club and kills the rest. He is then is killed by the "child monster" with a finger handgun. The lights go out and come back on to reveal three men and a woman who have appeared. They don't seem to see the child monster. One of the men asks the other three their names, and they all say "fear" The woman is Marina, a 20 year old Greek prisoner who was tortured. She recites a poem. Then the men recite a poem by Juan Gelman.
 Scene 19 There are prisoners "heavily made up with false eyelashes and lots of Rouge" handcuffed next to a wall. A guard poses them and recites "you who came from the shores of Tagus." A group of men and women come in, frightened, carrying packages. The guard sends them all out. An old woman comes in and asks to see her son. At first the guard says no, but then allows it. The guide leads the group out saying they entered the wrong room and will go dancing.
 Scene 20 Each of the guides leads their groups into one large room to watch the final scene together. The guides asks the audience to stand against the wall leaving the space in the center open. Behind a translucent screen is a table and a group of prostitutes. A man forces two more prostitutes behind the screen. Then four men lead a prisoner with his eyes bandaged to the center, singing. The men play "bling cockatoo" and spin the man around, poking at him. A prostitute tries to join but they will not allow it. The men then strip the prisoner and decide to play "hard boiled egg." They fight like children and one hits the prisoner on the head. He falls. They take him behind the screen and tie him to the table. The music gets louder and the men force the prostitutes to clap and sing. The music ends and the screen is lowered. The dead prisoner gets up and begins to dress. The guides tell the audience the show has ended and to clap.

Characters by Scene
guides, number contingent on number of audience groups
Voices, heard at intervals throughout

Man in room

Girl, with wet clothes
Man, with pistol

Coordinator
Mature Man, Teacher
Young Man, Pupil

Mother
Father

Group of Men, attack man in audience
Man, defends attacked man

Someone from the Audience, number contingent on number of audience groups
Usherette

Three men, Carry table
Group of Men, surround Girl
Two Workmen

Mother (sara Palacio de Verdt)
Father (Marcelo Verdt)
Two Children (Verdt girl and boy)
Chief
Two Policemen

Man in loincloth

Man (Roberto Quieto)
Neighbor #1
Neighbor #2
First Group of Men, tied together
Neighbor  #3
Second Group of Men, tied together
Official
Judge
Guard

Girl, with long hair (Hermenegilda)
Four Men, on skates
Husband of Hermenegilda
Mother of Hermenegilda
Neighbors

Man (Juan Pablo Maestre)
Woman (Mirfta Elena Misetich)
Two Policemen
Group of Policemen, dressed as sweepers

Game Players
Policemen, with clubs

Actor #1
Two Men, in box

Actress #1
Actress #2
Actor #2
Policeman #1
Policeman #2

Child-Monster
Children, play Anton Pirulero
First Man
Second Man
Third Man Young Woman

Two Guards
Prisoners
Visitors to Prison
Pretty Girl
Group of Guards, attack Pretty Girl
Little Old Lady
Outlandish-Looking Prisoner

Prostitutes
Man #1
Man #2
Man #3
Man #4

Analysis
The Interactive and site-specific  nature of Information For Foreigners "forces its audience to engage the subtle inter involvement between theater and the theater of state terrorism." The play introduces the audience to two levels of performance where they are shown both finished scenes, as well as what appear to be private and unfinished moments.  Critic W. B. Worthen notes that "In many respects, Information for Foreigners is a play about its audience... the Milgram experiment provides a kind of metaphor for the audience's function... in that observation repeatedly involves the audience in a kind of deference to authority."

References

1971 plays
Enforced disappearances in Argentina